Duane Lee Richards (born December 16, 1936) is a former Major League Baseball pitcher. He bats and throws right-handed.

Richards was signed by the Cincinnati Redlegs as an amateur free agent in 1955.

He appeared in only two games for the Cincinnati Reds during his abbreviated major league career.  His first appearance in the majors was on September 25, 1960 when he faced the Philadelphia Phillies at Crosley Field in Cincinnati.  He entered the game in the top of the fifth inning with the Reds trailing 5-0.  In one inning, he gave up two hits and two runs while walking one and striking out one.

His last appearance in the majors took place on October 1, 1960 against the Phillies at Connie Mack Stadium.  He entered the game in the bottom of the fifth inning with the Reds trailing the Phillies 4-2.  He pitched two innings giving up three hits and two runs but only one was earned.  He also walked one batter and struck out one.  He would never make another appearance in the major leagues.

His 311-game professional baseball career extended for ten years (1955–1964), with 309 games played in the minor leagues.

External links
, or Retrosheet

1936 births
Living people
Baseball players from Indiana
Buffalo Bisons (minor league) players
Cincinnati Reds players
Fort Walton Beach Jets players
Jersey City Jerseys players
Macon Peaches players
Major League Baseball pitchers
Nashville Vols players
Palatka Redlegs players
Savannah Reds players
Wenatchee Chiefs players
West Palm Beach Sun Chiefs players
Williamsport Mets players
People from Randolph County, Indiana